Vasco Filipe Pinto Quintino Varão (born 29 July 1981 in Lisbon) is a Portuguese former professional footballer who played as a midfielder.

References

External links

1981 births
Living people
Footballers from Lisbon
Portuguese footballers
Association football midfielders
Primeira Liga players
Liga Portugal 2 players
Segunda Divisão players
Atlético Clube de Portugal players
C.D. Olivais e Moscavide players
Odivelas F.C. players
C.D. Fátima players
Vitória F.C. players
S.C. Covilhã players
C.D. Mafra players
S.U. Sintrense players
Casa Pia A.C. players
Portugal youth international footballers